John William Gibson (June 2, 1959 – January 19, 2020) was a Canadian professional ice hockey defenceman who played 48 games in the National Hockey League for the Winnipeg Jets, Toronto Maple Leafs, and Los Angeles Kings.

Career statistics

Regular season and playoffs

References

External links
 

1959 births
2020 deaths
Binghamton Dusters players
Birmingham Bulls (CHL) players
Canadian ice hockey defencemen
Cincinnati Tigers players
Flint Spirits players
Houston Apollos players
Ice hockey people from Ontario
Los Angeles Kings draft picks
Los Angeles Kings players
New Brunswick Hawks players
New Haven Nighthawks players
Niagara Falls Flyers players
Saginaw Gears players
Sherbrooke Jets players
Sportspeople from St. Catharines
Toronto Maple Leafs players
Winnipeg Jets (1979–1996) players
Winnipeg Jets (WHA) players